Beg for It may refer to:
Beg for It (album), a 2009 album by Hardcore Superstar
"Beg for It" (song), a 2014 song by Iggy Azalea
"Beg for It", a 2011 song by Chris Brown from F.A.M.E.